Get Your Drugs Tested is a free public drug checking service located in Vancouver, Canada. It was founded by Dana Larsen in May 2019, accepting samples in person at their storefront and by mail from all across Canada.

Get Your Drugs Tested receives no public funding, and is entirely supported by The Medicinal Cannabis Dispensary.

They use FTIR Spectrometers and fentanyl test strips to offer free analysis of any drug or substance at their storefront or by mail.

In January 2021 they announced they had analyzed over 10,000 samples. In June 2021 they announced they had analyzed 15,000 samples. In March 2022 they announced they had analyzed 25,000 samples. In July 2022 they announced they had analyzed 30,000 samples.

All of their drug analysis results are posted to their website in a searchable database.

The service has received extensive media coverage.

See also
 Counterfeit drug
 Drug education
 Drug test
 Harm reduction
 Reagent testing

External links 
 Get Your Drugs Tested website

References

 
Alcohol and health
Addiction
Drug culture
Drug policy
Public health
2019 establishments in British Columbia
Canadian companies established in 2019
Companies based in Vancouver